is a JR West Geibi station located in Yamanouchi-chō, Shōbara, Hiroshima Prefecture, Japan. The station features one side platform.

History
1924-09-20: Yamanouchi Station opens as part of the Geibi Railway
1933-06-01: The Geibi Railway is nationalized and Yamanouchi Station becomes part of the Shōbara Line
1987-04-01: Japan National Railways is privatized, and Yamanouchi Station becomes a JR West station

Around the station
Yamanouchi Station is located about 7 km southwest of downtown Shōbara. The Shōbara campus of Hiroshima University is accessible from this station.

Highway access
Japan National Route 183
Hiroshima Prefectural Route 230 (Yamanouchi Teishajō Route)
Hiroshima Prefectural Route 442 (Sanedome Yamanouchi Route)
Hiroshima Prefectural Route 455 (Kinde Heiwa Route)

Connecting lines
All lines are JR West lines.
Geibi Line
Nanatsuka Station — Yamanouchi Station — Shimowachi Station

External links

 JR West

Geibi Line
Railway stations in Hiroshima Prefecture
Railway stations in Japan opened in 1924
Shōbara, Hiroshima